Callidiopini is a tribe of beetles in the subfamily Cerambycinae.

Genera
Biolib includes:

 Acuticeresium Villiers, 1970
 Acyrusa Pascoe, 1866
 Adrium Pascoe, 1866
 Aleiphaquilon Martins, 1970
 Anthribatus Fairmaire, 1896
 Araespor Thomson, 1878
 Asperidorsus Adlbauer, 2007
 Bethelium Pascoe, 1866
 Bornesalpinia Vives, 2010
 Bouakea Adlbauer, 2003
 Caccothorax Aurivillius, 1917
 Callidiopis Thomson, 1864
 Ceresiella Holzschuh, 1995
 Ceresium Newman, 1842
 Cilium Fairmaire, 1898
 Conoxilus Adlbauer, 2002
 Coscinedes Bates, 1885
 Curtomerus Stephens, 1839
 Diaspila Jordan, 1903
 Didymocantha Newman, 1840
 Eburida White, 1846
 Eburilla Aurivillius, 1912
 Ectinope Pascoe, 1875
 Ectosticta Pascoe, 1866
 Elegantozoum Adlbauer, 2004
 Examnes Pascoe, 1869
 Falsoibidion Pic, 1923
 Fregolia Gounelle, 1911
 Ganosomus Fairmaire, 1901
 Gelonaetha Thomson, 1878
 Herozoum Thomson, 1878
 Ipomoria Pascoe, 1866
 Linyra Fairmaire, 1898
 Marauna Martins & Galileo, 2006
 Metacopa Fairmaire, 1896
 Minutius Fairmaire, 1896
 Myrmeocorus Martins, 1975
 Nastocerus Fairmaire, 1897
 Neobethelium Blackburn, 1894
 Neocoridolon Melzer, 1930
 Neocorus Thomson, 1864
 Notoceresium Blackburn, 1901
 Oemona Newman, 1840
 Oxymagis Pascoe, 1866
 Paphora Pascoe, 1866
 Paralygesis Vives, Sudre, Mille & Cazères, 2011
 Parasalpinia Hayashi, 1962
 Prosype Thomson, 1864
 Pseudodemonax Vives & Heffern, 2012
 Psylacrida Thomson, 1878
 Salpinia Pascoe, 1869
 Sassandrioides Adlbauer, 2008
 Semiope Pascoe, 1869
 Sidellus McKeown, 1945
 Stenobrium Kolbe, 1893
 Stenodryas Bates, 1873
 Stenygrinum Bates, 1873
 Sternangustum Jordan, 1894
 Sudreia Vives & Mille, 2015
 Teladum Holzschuh, 2011
 Teocchius Adlbauer & Sudre, 2003
 Tethionea Pascoe, 1869
 Thephantes Pascoe, 1867
 Trimeroderus Fairmaire, 1896
 Trinophylum Bates, 1878
 Wanatidius Vives & Sudre, 2018
 Zarina (beetle) Fairmaire, 1898

References

Cerambycinae
Polyphaga tribes